Alfonso Jesús Martínez Alcázar (born 30 January 1975) is a Mexican politician from the National Action Party. From 2009 to 2011 he served as Deputy of the LXI Legislature of the Mexican Congress representing Michoacán.

See also
 List of municipal presidents of Morelia

References

1975 births
Living people
Politicians from Michoacán
People from Morelia
National Action Party (Mexico) politicians
21st-century Mexican politicians
Morelia Institute of Technology alumni
Members of the Congress of Michoacán
Deputies of the LXI Legislature of Mexico
Members of the Chamber of Deputies (Mexico) for Michoacán